Blake Peak (or Blake Mountain) is a mountain located in Essex County, New York. The mountain is named after Mills Blake (died 1930), Verplanck Colvin’s chief assistant during the Adirondack Survey. 
It is part of the Colvin Range.
Blake Peak is flanked to the northeast by Mount Colvin, and to the southwest by Pinnacle.

The northwest side of Blake Peak drains into the East Branch of the Ausable River, between Upper and Lower Ausable Lakes. 
The Ausable River drains into Lake Champlain, which in turn drains into Canada's Richelieu River, the Saint Lawrence River, and into the Gulf of Saint Lawrence. 
The southeast side of Blake Peak drains into the West Inlet of Elk Lake, thence into The Branch of the Schroon River, the Hudson River, and into New York Bay.

Blake Peak was formerly thought to have an elevation of at least , so it was included on the list of 46 Adirondack High Peaks. More recent surveys show Blake and three other peaks fell slightly short, but they remain on the list.

See also 
 List of mountains in New York
 Northeast 111 4000-footers
 Adirondack High Peaks
 Adirondack Forty-Sixers

Notes

External links 
 
 

Mountains of Essex County, New York
Adirondack High Peaks
Mountains of New York (state)